Oilfield is an unincorporated community in Clark County, Illinois, United States. Oilfield is located along Illinois Route 49 north of Casey.

References

Unincorporated communities in Clark County, Illinois
Unincorporated communities in Illinois